The Forestry Bureau is an agency of the Council of Agriculture of Taiwan (ROC).

History
The Forestry Bureau was originally established in 1945 as the Office of Forestry Administration. In June 1947, the office was disbanded and the Forestry Administration Division was established. The division was then reorganized on 15 February 1960 to form the Forestry Bureau.

Organizational structure

Operational divisions
 Forest Planning Division
 Forest Administration Division
 Watershed Management Division
 Reforestation and Production Division
 Conservation and Recreation Division
 Conservation Division

Administrative divisions
 Secretariat
 Personnel Office
 Accounting Office
 Civil Service Ethics Office

Branch offices
 Luodong Forest District Office
 Hsinchu Forest District Office
 Dongshi Forest District Office
 Nantou Forest District Office
 Chiayi Forest District Office
 Alishan Forest Railway and Cultural Heritage Office
 Pingtung Forest District Office
 Taitung Forest District Office
 Hualien Forest District Office
 Aerial Survey Office

Transportation
The agency is accessible within walking distance East from Shandao Temple Station of Taipei Metro.

See also
 Council of Agriculture (Taiwan)

References

External links

 

1960 establishments in Taiwan
Executive Yuan
Taiwan
Taiwan
Forestry in Taiwan